This is a list of ocean liners past and present, which are passenger ships engaged in the transportation of passengers and goods in transoceanic voyages. Ships primarily designed for pleasure cruises are listed at List of cruise ships. Some ships which have been explicitly designed for both line voyages and cruises, or which have been converted from liners to cruise ships, may be listed in both places. Also included are cargo liners designed to carry both cargo and passengers.

Legend

Single name
The following ships were not renamed anytime during their career.

Multi-name

Note: The ships listed here were renamed, and in some cases multiple times in their careers.

A-D

E-H

I-L

M-P

Q-Z

See also

 List of cruise ships
 Timeline of largest passenger ships

References

Further reading
 Russell, Mark A. "Steamship nationalism: Transatlantic passenger liners as symbols of the German Empire." International Journal of Maritime History 28.2 (2016): 313-334.

Ocean liners